Atkins is a surname of English origin. At the time of the British Census of 1881, its frequency was highest in Buckinghamshire (6.0 times the British average), followed by Huntingdonshire, Leicestershire, Warwickshire, Rutland, Kent, Dorset, Norfolk, and Berkshire.  Atkins may refer to:

 Al Atkins (born 1947), British singer
 Anna Atkins (1799–1871), British pioneer of photography
 Barry K. Atkins (1911–2005), American admiral
 B. T. S. Atkins (Sue Atkins) (born 1931), British lexicographer
 Brett Atkins (born 1964), Australian rugby league footballer of the 1980s and 1990s
 Charlotte Atkins (born 1950), United Kingdom Member of Parliament
 Chet Atkins (1924–2001), guitarist and record producer
 Cholly Atkins (1913–2003), American choreographer for Motown artists
 Christopher Atkins (born 1961), American actor
 Chucky Atkins (born 1974), NBA basketball player
 C. Clyde Atkins (1914–1999), American judge
 Colin Atkins, Canadian politician
 Coral Atkins (1936–2016), British actress
 David Atkins (born 1955), Australian stage director
 Doug Atkins (1930–2015), American football player
 Eileen Atkins (born 1934), English actress
 Ernie Atkins (1890–1972), Australian Rules footballer
 Essence Atkins (born 1972), American actress
 Frances Atkins, British chef
 Garrett Atkins (born 1979), American baseball player
 Gary Atkins (born 1969), rugby league footballer
 Geno Atkins (born 1988), NFL football player
 Henry Atkins (disambiguation)
 Humphrey Atkins (1922–1996), British politician
 Ian Atkins (born 1957), English footballer
 Sir Ivor Atkins (1869–1953), Welsh choirmaster
 Jeffrey Atkins (born 1976), American rapper Ja Rule
 Joe Atkins (born 1965), Minnesota State Representative
 John F. Atkins, Irish scientist
 John Atkins (American football) (born 1992), American football player
 Juan Atkins (born 1962), American techno musician
 Kelley Atkins (born 1966), Canadian curler Kelley Law
 Larry Atkins (born 1975), formerly of the Kansas City Chiefs
 Lucy Atkins, British author
 Madeleine Atkins CBE, British academic
 Mark Atkins, Australian didgeridoo player
 Martin Atkins (born 1959), British drummer   
 Michael Atkins (1747-1812), Irish actor and theatre manager
 Nicole Atkins (born 1978), American singer-songwriter
 Norman Atkins (1934–2010), Canadian politician
 Peter Atkins (born 1940), professor of chemistry and author
 Robert Atkins (nutritionist) (1930–2003), physician noted for the Atkins Nutritional Approach (Atkins diet)
 Robert Atkins (politician) (born 1946), United Kingdom politician
 Rodney Atkins (born 1969), country singer
 Ros Atkins, BBC News presenter
 Ross Atkins (born 1989), English footballer
 Ross Atkins (baseball) (born 1973), baseball executive
 Sharif Atkins (born 1975), actor
 Simon Green Atkins (1863-1934), American educator and founder of Winston-Salem State University
 Susan Atkins (1948–2009), Manson family member
 Tom Atkins (disambiguation)
 Tommy Atkins, World War I nickname for the iconic British soldier
 Toni Atkins (born 1962), American politician
 Travis Atkins (1975–2007), United States Army soldier; recipient of the Medal of Honor
 Vera Atkins (1908–2000), British intelligence officer
 Victoria Atkins (born 1976), British Conservative Party politician, Member of Parliament (MP) for Louth and Horncastle since May 2015
 William Atkins (architect) (1811–1887), Irish architect
 William Atkins (footballer) (born 1939), former professional footballer

Fictional characters
 Alfie Atkins, main character in the Swedish children's books series with the same name
 Maddison Atkins, popular character from the lonelygirl15 alternate reality game
 Marmalade Atkins, fictional character from Thames Television
 State Comptroller Atkins, public official in The Simpsons' unnamed state

See also
Atkins (disambiguation)
Adkins

References

English-language surnames
Surnames of English origin
Patronymic surnames